Vere Harold Esmond Harmsworth, 3rd Viscount Rothermere (27 April 1925 – 1 September 1998), known as Vere Harmsworth until 1978, was a British newspaper magnate. He controlled large media interests in the United Kingdom and United States.

Business life
Rothermere became the Chairman of Associated Newspapers in 1970, taking over from his father Esmond Cecil Harmsworth, 2nd Viscount Rothermere, who had Alzheimer's disease. He was responsible for the relaunch of the Daily Mail as a tabloid, after which its circulation increased greatly under editor Sir David English. He may also be considered the founder of The Mail on Sunday. After the death of his father in 1978, he also became chairman of parent company Daily Mail and General Trust plc (DMGT). He attempted to combine the companies in a manner calculated to avoid taxation. An artefact of this plan was the ownership of Associated Newspapers being vested in Associated Newspapers Holdings (ANH), ownership of which was split 50.2%-49.8% between DMGT and its wholly owned subsidiary Daily Mail & General Holdings (DMGH). (Since that time DMGH's name has been transferred to ANH, and the old DMGH has become Derry Street Properties)..

English succeeded him as chairman of Associated Newspapers (but not of ANH or of the parent companies) in 1992. When English died in mid-1998, Rothermere resumed the chairmanship of Associated Newspapers and replaced his protégé as president of the Commonwealth Press Union, only to die himself some months later, still chairman of DMGT, after being fatally stricken with a heart attack while dining with his son (and successor) Jonathan Harmsworth, 4th Viscount Rothermere.

Harmsworth was a member of the Founding Council of the Rothermere American Institute, which he helped establish alongside his sister Lady Cromer and Vyvyan Harmsworth.

Harmsworth's newspapers supported the Thatcher government, but following Tony Blair's landslide general election victory he defected to the Labour Party.

Family life
On 21 March 1957 Rothermere married actress Patricia Brooks. They had three children:

 Geraldine Theodora Gabriel Harmsworth (born 25 July 1957)
 Camilla Patricia Caroline Harmsworth (born 28 July 1964)
 Harold Jonathan Esmond Vere Harmsworth, 4th Viscount Rothermere (born 3 December 1967)

Following the death of his first wife on 12 August 1992, Rothermere married his longtime girlfriend, Maiko Jeong Shun Lee, in 1993.

References

Further reading

External links

 Lord Rothermere – BBC News
 Vere Harold Esmond Harmsworth, 3rd Viscount Rothermere – thepeerage.com
 Rothermere American Institute

1925 births
1998 deaths
British newspaper publishers (people)
Conservative Party (UK) hereditary peers
Vere
People educated at Eton College
Kent School alumni
Labour Party (UK) hereditary peers
3